Dana Smith may refer to:
 Dana Shell Smith, American diplomat
 Dana Smith, a character from Robert Muchamore's CHERUB book series